David Dunkerley (born 1952) is a former professional rugby league footballer who played in the 1970s and 1980s.

Background
David Dunkerley worked at St James's University Hospital, Leeds.

Playing career

County Cup Final appearances
David Dunkerley played left-, i.e. number 8, in York's 8-18 defeat by Bradford Northern in the 1978–79 Yorkshire County Cup Final during the 1978–79 season at Headingley Rugby Stadium, Leeds on Saturday 28 October 1978, in front of a crowd of 10,429.

Notable tour matches
David Dunkerley played in York's 2-29 defeat by Australia at Clarence Street, York on Tuesday 14 November 1978, under temporary floodlights.

Club career
David Dunkerley broke his collar bone during mid-November 1975, and returned to play 6-weeks later in the match against Hull F.C. at The Boulevard, Kingston upon Hull on Thursday 1 January 1976, 3-days later he broke his collar bone again in the match against Barrow at Clarence Street, York on Sunday 4 January 1976, he returned to training during March 1976, but he played no further matches in the during the 1975–76 season.

Genealogy information
David Dunkerley's marriage to Shelley E. (née Wilson) was registered during fourth ¼ 1983 in Leeds district.

References

External links
Search for "David Dunkerley" at britishnewspaperarchive.co.uk

1952 births
Living people
English rugby league players
Keighley Cougars players
Rugby league players from Leeds
Rugby league props
Rugby league second-rows
York Wasps players